The following is a list of the 27 cantons of the Pyrénées-Atlantiques department, in France, following the French canton reorganisation which came into effect in March 2015:

 Anglet
 Artix et Pays de Soubestre
 Baïgura et Mondarrain
 Bayonne-1
 Bayonne-2
 Bayonne-3
 Biarritz
 Billère et Coteaux de Jurançon
 Le Cœur de Béarn
 Hendaye-Côte Basque-Sud
 Lescar, Gave et Terres du Pont-Long
 Montagne Basque
 Nive-Adour
 Oloron-Sainte-Marie-1
 Oloron-Sainte-Marie-2
 Orthez et Terres des Gaves et du Sel
 Ouzom, Gave et Rives du Neez
 Pau-1
 Pau-2
 Pau-3
 Pau-4
 Pays de Bidache, Amikuze et Ostibarre
 Pays de Morlaàs et du Montanérès
 Saint-Jean-de-Luz
 Terres des Luys et Coteaux du Vic-Bilh
 Ustaritz-Vallées de Nive et Nivelle
 Vallées de l'Ousse et du Lagoin

References